Series 45 of University Challenge began on 13 July 2015 on BBC Two.

Results
Winning teams are highlighted in bold.
Teams with green scores (winners) returned in the next round, while those with red scores (losers) were eliminated.
Teams with orange scores had to win one more match to return in the next round (current highest scoring losers, teams that won their first quarter-final match, teams that won their second quarter-final match having lost their first, or teams that won their first quarter-final match and lost their second).
Teams with yellow scores indicate that two further matches had to be played and won (teams that lost their first quarter-final match).
Team with gold score in the final indicate the champion of the series, while the team with silver score in the final indicate the runner-up.
A score in italics indicates a match decided on a tie-breaker question.

First round

Highest Scoring Losers play-offs

Second round

Quarter-finals

Semi-finals

Final

 The trophy and title were awarded to the Peterhouse, Cambridge team comprising Thomas Langley, Oscar Powell, Hannah Woods and Julian Sutcliffe.
 The trophy was presented by Marcus du Sautoy.

Spin-off: Christmas Special 2015
Each year, a Christmas special sequence is aired featuring distinguished alumni. Out of 7 first-round winners, the top 4 highest-scoring teams progress to the semi-finals. The teams consist of  celebrities who represent their alma maters.

Results
Winning teams are highlighted in bold.
Teams with green scores (winners) returned in the next round, while those with red scores (losers) were eliminated.
Teams with grey scores won their match but did not achieve a high enough score to proceed to the next round.
A score in italics indicates a match decided on a tie-breaker question.

First Round

Standings for the winners

Semi-finals

Final

The winning Magdalen College, Oxford team consisted of Robin Lane Fox, Heather Berlin, Louis Theroux and Matt Ridley beat the University of Sheffield and their team of Sid Lowe, Nicci Gerrard, Adam Hart and Ruth Reed.

References

External links
University Challenge homepage
Blanchflower Results Table
University Challenge 2015–16 at subsaga.com

2016
2015 British television seasons
2016 British television seasons